the 2020 Indonesia Pro Futsal League, is the thirteenth season of the Indonesia Pro Futsal League competition held by the Indonesian Futsal Federation, as well as the fifth season of futsal competition under the name "Professional Futsal League". The season start on 7 December 2019 and is scheduled to finish on 28 March 2021.

Vamos Mataram are the defending champions. A total of 16 Indonesian futsal clubs will compete for the championship of this competition, with four clubs coming from the 2019 Nusantara Futsal League semifinalists.

On 16 March 2020, the competition was suspended due to the COVID-19 pandemic in Indonesia, and restarted on 20 March 2021. All matches after the restart were played in Yogyakarta, with the final four played at the Among Rogo Sports Hall.

Teams
A total of 16 Indonesian futsal clubs which are divided into two groups competed this season. Four of these clubs are 2019 Nusantara Futsal League.

Team changes
 Permata Indah FC Manokwari resigned and was replaced by Red Manguni FC from Minahasa.
 AXM FC Manado, one of the promoted teams from the 2019 Nusantara Futsal League, they resign from the competition due to internal problems. and was replaced by club from Surabaya, Mutiara FC
 Devina Kamiada FC resigned and was replaced by Futsal 35 FC from Bandung.

Name changes
 Young Rior FC partnership with corporate Aneka Tambang, and the name into MAS Young Rior FC.

Venues and Schedule
Thirteen venues in eleven cities in Indonesia became the venue for the Indonesia 2020 Professional Futsal League. Regular season (group stage) began from December 7, 2019 to March 22, 2020, while the Big Four (final series) took place on March 28 and 29, 2020 in Yogyakarta.

Indonesian Professional Futsal League season 2020 regular schedule.

Regular season

Group A

Group B

Final season 
Final season will be played on 27 and 28 March 2021.
 All matches will be played in Yogyakarta.
 All times listed are UTC+7

Semi-final

Third place match

Final

Season statistics

Scoring

Top goalscorers

1 own goal
 Angga Sidik (Mutiara FC, against Cosmo Futsal on matchday 3rd)
 Radyan Ferdiansyah (Futsal 35, against BJL 2000 on matchday 5th)
 Febriand Alfindrio (Halus FC, against Giga FC on matchday 6th)
 Petrus Alvarez (Red Manguni, against Bintang Timur on matchday 6th)
 Afif Rizky (Halus FC, against Blacksteel on matchday 7th)
 Anzar (Vamos FC, against Futsal 35 on matchday 8th)
 Diaz Riansyah (Kancil BBK, against SKN FC on matchday 8th)
 Ikrima Nofiansyah (Blacksteel, against BJL 2000 on matchday 10th)
 Muhammad Jumadil Muzaik (Bank Sumut, against Kancil BBK on matchday 12th)
 Rama Ramdhani (Red Manguni, against SKN FC Kebumen on matchday 12th)

Top assists

Hat-tricks

 
Notes
4 Player scored 4 goals

Notes

References

External links
 PFL 2020

2020
Indonesia
Indonesia